Independence Square also referred to as Kazakh Eli Square, is the main square in Astana, Kazakhstan. 

It was created in October 2009. In September 2015, the square transformed into a historic village in honor of the 550th anniversary of the Kazakh Khanate. Defender of the Fatherland Day and Constitution Day parades have generally been held on the square. Earlier in 2015, the Banner of Victory was brought to Astana to be trooped through Independence Square by personnel of the Aibyn Presidential Regiment in the Defender of the Fatherland Day/Victory Day parade on 7 May. Nauryz events are also held at the square.

Landmarks
 Palace of Peace and Reconciliation
 Kazakh Eli monument
 Shabyt Palace of Creativity
 Hazrat Sultan Mosque
 Palace of Independence
 National Museum of the Republic of Kazakhstan

Gallery

References

National squares
Squares in Astana